= CommunityNet Aotearoa =

CommunityNet Aotearoa is a New Zealand website that provides how-to guides, advice and tools for charities and community groups.

It was founded in 1998 with support from the Department of Internal Affairs. At its launch, the spokesperson for the steering committee said (inter alia) "We have indeed been fortunate that DIA has taken a hands-off approach and insisted from the very beginning that it would be governed by community. Well done Internal Affairs." Since 2017 the website is maintained by the NZ Navigator Trust.

Along with case studies, how-to guides, "hot topics", categories of links, and community notices, it offers free weekly or monthly email newsletters.
